Leo Brian Steele (born 19 January 1929) is a former New Zealand rugby union player. A halfback, Steele represented  and Horowhenua at a provincial level. He was a member of the New Zealand national side, the All Blacks, for their 1951 tour of Australia, on which he played in nine matches, including three internationals.

References

1929 births
Living people
Rugby union players from Wellington City
People educated at Wellington High School, New Zealand
New Zealand rugby union players
New Zealand international rugby union players
Wellington rugby union players
Horowhenua-Kapiti rugby union players
Rugby union scrum-halves